Sambiao Basanung (11 June 1922 – 15 November 1981) was a Filipino swimmer. He competed at the 1948 Summer Olympics and the 1952 Summer Olympics.

References

External links
 

1922 births
1981 deaths
Filipino male swimmers
Olympic swimmers of the Philippines
Swimmers at the 1948 Summer Olympics
Swimmers at the 1952 Summer Olympics
Place of birth missing
20th-century Filipino people